Miss Indonesia 2018 is the 14th edition of the Miss Indonesia pageant. It was held on 22 February 2018, at MNC Studio, Kebon Jeruk, Jakarta, Indonesia. Miss World 2017, Manushi Chhillar of India, attended the awarding night.

Achintya Holte Nielsen as Miss Indonesia 2017 from West Nusa Tenggara crowned her successor, Alya Nurshabrina from West Java. She represented Indonesia in Miss World 2018.

Judges 

 Liliana Tanoesoedibjo, founder and chairwoman of Miss Indonesia Organization.
 Peter F. Saerang, professional make-up and hairstylist.
 Wulan Tilaar Widarto, vice-chairwoman of Martha Tilaar Group.
 Ferry Salim, actor, entrepreneur, and ambassador of UNICEF to Indonesia.
 Natasha Mannuela, Miss Indonesia 2016, Runner-up 2 Miss World 2016, Miss World Asia 2016.

Result

Placements

Top 16 

 Banten §
 Riau §
 Jambi §
 Aceh §
 Central Java §
 West Java §
 North Sumatra
 South Kalimantan
 Yogya Special Region
 West Sumatra
 Central Kalimantan
 Jakarta SCR
 North Kalimantan
 East Java
 North Sulawesi
 West Nusa Tenggara
§ Placed into the Top 16 by Fast Track

Top 5 

 North Sulawesi
 Aceh
 Central Java
 West Java
 West Sumatra

Fast Track Event
Fast track events held during preliminary round and the winners of Fast Track events are automatically qualified to enter the semifinal round. This year's fast track events include : Talent, Catwalk (Modeling), Sports, Nature and Beauty Fashion, Social Media, And Beauty with a Purpose.

Special Awards

Contestants 
Contestants of Miss Indonesia 2018 from 34 Provinces in Indonesia.

Crossovers 
Contestants who previously competed in other local beauty pageants or in international beauty pageants and reality modeling competition : 

Puteri Indonesia
2022: Bangka Belitung - Sabrina Daniel (TBA)

Miss Earth Indonesia
2017: Central Kalimantan - Mercy Andrea (Top 10 & Miss Animal Welfare)

Miss Global Indonesia
2017: Riau Islands - Anastasha Carolyna Lya Handoyo
2017: Papua - Ludia Amaye Maryen (Miss Congeniality)

Puteri Citra Indonesia
2010: Southeast Sulawesi - Lita Hendratno (Runner-up 2)

Puteri Selam Indonesia
2017: Southeast Sulawesi - Lita Hendratno

Wajah Femina
2014: West Java - Alya Nurshabrina (Winner)

References

External links 
 Official site

2018 beauty pageants
Miss Indonesia